Agara may refer to a place in:

Georgia
 Agara, Georgia, station at Khashuri–Vale railway line

India
 Agara, Chamarajanagar, Chamarajanagar District, Karnataka
 Agara, Bangalore, a panchayat village in Bangalore Urban District, Karnataka
 Agara, Bangalore Rural, Bangalore Rural District, Karnataka
 Agara, Malur, a village in Malur Taluka, Kolar District, Karnataka
 Agara, Mulbagal, a panchayat village in Mulbagi Taluka, Kolar district, Karnataka
 Agara, a village in Tayalur panchayat village, Karnataka

Nepal
 Agara, Narayani, Nepal

See also
 Agra (disambiguation)